The Capital Regional District (CRD) is a local government administrative district encompassing the southern tip of Vancouver Island and the southern Gulf Islands in the Canadian province of British Columbia. The CRD is one of several regional districts in British Columbia and had an official population of 415,451 as of the Canada 2021 Census.

The CRD encompasses the thirteen municipalities of Greater Victoria and three unincorporated areas: Juan de Fuca Electoral Area on Vancouver Island, Salt Spring Island Electoral Area, and Southern Gulf Islands Electoral Area. The CRD also acts as the local government for most purposes in the Electoral Areas. CRD headquarters is in the City of Victoria, although there are many office and operational facilities throughout the region.

The CRD was formed in 1966 as a federation of seven municipalities and five electoral areas to provide coordination of regional issues and local government in rural areas in the Greater Victoria region.

Demographics 

Ethnicity 

Note: Totals greater than 100% due to multiple origin responses.

Political divisions 
The CRD comprises the 13 municipalities of Greater Victoria, three electoral areas and 10 Indigenous reserves. The reserves have a relatively small portion of the population with 5,244 participating in the 2016 census. Some reserves did not participate; those that did are included in the population figures of the municipality or electoral area encompassing them, however the CRD regional government and local governments have no jurisdiction over reserves. Saanich and Victoria together have over 50 percent of the region's population.

Electoral Areas

Salt Spring Island Electoral Area

The Salt Spring Island Electoral Area of the Capital Regional District (CRD) of the Canadian province of British Columbia consists of unincorporated areas in the CRD located on Salt Spring Island. It is represented by one director on the CRD.

The major localities encompassed by the electoral area are:
Ganges
Fulford Harbour
Vesuvius Bay
Long Harbour
Beaver Point
Musgrave Landing

According to the Canada 2021 Census:
Population: 11,635
% Change (2016-2021): 28.9
Area (km².): 182.23
Density (persons per km².): 63.8

Southern Gulf Islands Electoral Area

The Southern Gulf Islands Electoral Area of the Capital Regional District (CRD) of the Canadian province of British Columbia consists of unincorporated districts in the CRD located on Galiano, Saturna, Mayne, and North and South Pender Islands, as well as many smaller islands located in the Gulf of Georgia north and east of Victoria. It is previously known as the Outer Gulf Islands Electoral Area. Its population of 6,101 is represented by one director on the CRD.

The major localities encompassed by the electoral area are:
Bedwell Harbour (South Pender Island)
Montague Harbour (Galiano Island)
Otter Bay (North Pender Island)
Saturna (Saturna Island)
Sturdies Bay (Galiano Island)
Village Bay (Mayne Island)

Juan de Fuca Electoral Area
The Juan de Fuca Electoral Area is an Electoral Area of the CRD.
It consists of the District's unincorporated land on Vancouver Island, including the neighbourhood of Willis Point (Greater Victoria) on the Saanich Inlet, Malahat, on the western shore of Saanich Inlet, and the Western Communities localities of East Sooke, Jordan River, Otter Point, Shirley, Port Renfrew, inclusive of the First Nations reserves of Gordon River 2 and Pacheena 1, which are within its territory.  Its population of 5,531 is represented by a single director of the CRD. The total land area is 1,502.24 km² (580.0 sq mi).  Population figures do not included residents of Indian Reserves, whether band members or non-indigenous persons.

Administrative role
The board of directors are either directly elected officials or are appointed from within the region's elected municipal councils.

The CRD's responsibilities include recycling, operating the regional landfill, building and operating sewage treatment plants, a sewer source control program, regional water supply, funding for non-profit arts groups, regional planning, funding health facilities, and overseeing thirty regional parks, trails, and regional park reserves encompassing over 100 km².  The CRD is the sole shareholder of the Capital Region Housing Corporation, which owns and operates over 1200 rental housing units. In certain areas, the CRD can pass bylaws that are binding on a portion of the geographical area or the entire geographical area. These include a "clean air bylaw" smoking ban in all public places and patios in restaurants/pubs.

The CRD assumes responsibilities ordinarily undertaken by municipalities in unincorporated areas of the CRD. These responsibilities include animal control, building inspection, fire protection, and bylaw enforcement. Some of the region's municipalities avail themselves of some of these services in a contractual arrangement with the CRD.

Capital Regional Hospital District
The CRHD's primary responsibility is to provide the region's share of capital funding for the region's health facilities and equipment. The region's health care delivery is the responsibility of the Vancouver Island Health Authority (VIHA). The CRHD shares the same Board of Directors with the CRD.

See also

 Metro Vancouver Regional District
 Greater Victoria
Gulf Islands

Notes

References
Specific

General
 Community Profile: Capital H (Part 1), Regional District Electoral Area, British Columbia; Statistics Canada
 Community Profile: Capital H (Part 2), Regional District Electoral Area, British Columbia; Statistics Canada
 Interactive map of the Capital Regional District; British Columbia Statistics

External links

 
Capital
Metropolitan planning organizations